Out of the Blue may refer to:

Film and television

Film
Out of the Blue (1931 film), a British musical by Gene Gerrard 
Out of the Blue (1947 film), an American comedy directed by Leigh Jason
Out of the Blue: Live at Wembley, a 1980 concert film by Electric Light Orchestra
Out of the Blue (1980 film), a Canadian film by Dennis Hopper
Out of the Blue (television play), a 1991 British drama directed by Nick Hamm
Out of the Blue (2003 film), an American documentary
Out of the Blue (2006 film), a New Zealand film directed by Robert Sarkies
 Out of the Blue (2022 film), an American thriller film written and directed by Neil LaBute

Television
Out of the Blue (1979 TV series), an American sitcom
Out of the Blue (1995 TV series), a British police drama
Out of the Blue (1996 TV series), an American sitcom for teens
Out of the Blue (1998 TV series), an Irish documentary series presented by Derek Davis
Out of the Blue (2003 TV series), an Australian seafood and travel show
Out of the Blue (2008 TV series), an Australian soap opera
Out of the Blue (2011 TV series), a British programme co-hosted by Joanne Salley
"Out of the Blue" (Sanctuary), a season-three episode of Sanctuary
Out of the Blue Enterprises, or 9 Story USA, an American children's television company

Music

Performers
Out of the Blue (American band), a 1980s jazz ensemble
Out of the Blue (British band), an all-male a cappella group from the University of Oxford and Oxford Brookes University
Out of the Blue (Yale University), a co-ed a cappella group

Albums
Out of the Blue (Alison Brown album) or the title song, 1998
Out of the Blue (Anne Kirkpatrick album) or the title song, 1991
Out of the Blue (Blue Mitchell album), 1959
Out of the Blue (Claudia Carawan album), 2003
Out of the Blue (Debbie Gibson album), or the title song (see below), 1987
Out of the Blue (Donnie Iris album), 1992
Out of the Blue (Electric Light Orchestra album), 1977
Out of the Blue (Mike + The Mechanics album) or the title song, 2019
Out of the Blue (Sonny Red album), 1960
Out of the Blue (System F album) or the title song, by Ferry Corsten (recording as System F), 2001
Out of the Blue (Systems in Blue album) or the title song, 2008
Out of the Blue (EP), by the Angels, or the title song, 1979
Out of the Blue, by "Blue" Gene Tyranny, 1977
Out of the Blue, by Blue Raspberry, 2005
Out of the Blue, by Blue Swede, 1975
Out of the Blue, a West End musical cast recording released by Stage Door Records

Songs
"Out of the Blue" (Debbie Gibson song), 1988
"Out of the Blue" (Delta Goodrem song), 2004
"My My, Hey Hey (Out of the Blue)", by Neil Young, 1979
"Out of the Blue", by Alan Parsons from The Time Machine, 1999
"Out of the Blue", by Aly & AJ from Into the Rush, 2005
"Out of the Blue", by the Band from The Last Waltz, 1978
"Out of the Blue", by Chad Brownlee from Hearts on Fire, 2016
"Out of the Blue", by David Gilmour from About Face, 1984
"Out of the Blue", by Elton John from Blue Moves, 1976; closing theme of the TV series Top Gear, 1977–2001
"Out of the Blue", by George Harrison from All Things Must Pass, 1970
"Out of the Blue", by Julian Casablancas from Phrazes for the Young, 2009
"Out of the Blue", by Michael Learns to Rock from Paint My Love, 1996
"Out of the Blue", by Miles Davis, 1951
"Out of the Blue", by Robert Wyatt from Comicopera, 2007
"Out of the Blue", by Roxy Music from Country Life, 1974
"Out of the Blue", by Ryan Leslie from Ryan Leslie, 2009
"Out of the Blue", by Tommy James and the Shondells, 1967
"Out of the Blue", by Toyah from Dreamchild, 1997
"Out of the Blue", by Wreckless Eric from Big Smash!, 1980
"Out of the Blue", a composition by Hubert Bath used as theme music for Sports Report
"Out of the Blue (Into the Fire)", by the The from Infected, 1986

Other uses
Out of the Blue (book), a 2022 biography of Liz Truss
Out of the Blue, a 2008 novel by Belinda Jones
Out of the Blue, a musical by Shunichi Tokura
Out of the Blue, an arts charity based at the Dalmeny Street drill hall

See also
Out of Blue, a 2018 film
Out the Blue (disambiguation)
Out of the Blues (disambiguation)